The Roman Catholic Diocese of Béziers was situated in France.  It is no longer an independent diocese, and is part of the Diocese of Montpellier.

Traditionally, the first Bishop of Béziers is considered to be the Egyptian saint, Aphrodisius, said to have sheltered the Holy Family at Hermopolis and to have become a disciple of Christ, also to have accompanied Sergius Paulus to Gaul when the latter went thither to found the Church of Narbonne, and to have died a martyr at Béziers.

Local traditions made St. Aphrodisius arrive at Béziers mounted on a camel. Hence the custom of leading a camel in the procession at Béziers on the feast of the saint; this lasted until the French Revolution but was revived in the late 20th century.

The first historically known bishop is Paulinus mentioned in 418; St. Guiraud was Bishop of Béziers from 1121 to 1123; St. Dominic refused the See of Béziers to devote himself to the crusade against the Albigenses. Among the fifteen synods held at Béziers was that of 356 held by Saturninus of Arles, an Arian archbishop, which condemned Hilary of Poitiers. Later synods of 1233, 1246 and 1255 condemned the Cathars. A Papal Brief of 16 June 1877, authorized the bishops of Montpellier to call themselves bishops of Montpellier, Béziers, Agde, Lodève and Saint-Pons, in memory of the different dioceses united in the present Diocese of Montpellier.

Bishops

To 1000

Saint Aphrodisius (Aphrodise) 250 ?
Paulin I 408
Dyname 451
 Hermès  461
Sedatus (Saint Sédat) 589
Pierre I 639
Crescitaire 683
Pacotase 688
Ervige 693
 Wulfégaire  791
Etienne I 833
Alaric 875–878
Agilbert 887–897
Fructuarius  897–898
Matfred I 898
Reginald (Raynald) I de Béziers 906–933 or 930
Rodoaldus (Raoul) 930 or 936–957
Bernard I Géraud 957–978 or 980
Matfred II 990–1010 or 1011

1000 to 1300

Urbain 1016
Etienne II 1017–1036 or 1037
Bernard II 1035 or 1037–1046
Bèrenger I 1050–1053
Bernard III Arnaud 1053–c. 1060
Bèrenger II 1061–c. 1066
Matfred III 1077–1096 or c. 1070–c. 1093
Arnaud de Lévézon 1096–1121
Saint Guiraud (Geraldus, Geraud) 1121–1123
Guillaume I de Serviez (Servian, Cerviez) 1127
Bermond de Lévezon 1128–1152
Guillaume II 1152–1154 or 1157
Raymond I 1159
Guillaume III 1159–1167
Bernard IV de Gaucelin 1167–1184
Geofroy (Gausfred) de Marseille 1185–1199
Guillaume de Rocozels (Rocozels) 1199–1205
Ermengaud 1205–1208
Reginald( Renaud) II de Montpeyroux 1208–1211
Pierre II d'Aigrefeuille 1211–1212
Bertrand de Saint Gervais 1212–1215
Raymond II Lenoir January–20 April 1215
Bernard V de Cuxac 1215–1242
R. 1243
P. 1244
Raymond III de Salles (Salle) 1245–1247
Raymond IV de Vaihauquez (Valhauquès) 1247–1261
Pons de Saint Just 1261–1293
Raymond V de Colombiers 1293–1294
Berengar Fredol the Elder, 1294–1305, cardinal

1300 to 1500

Richard Neveu 1305–1309
Berengar Fredol the Younger, 1309–1312, cardinal
Guilhaume V Frédol 1313–1349
Guilhaume VI de Landorre (Laudun) 1349–1350 or 1349–1349
Hugues I de la Jugie 1353 ou 1349–1371, later bishop of Carcassonne (1371)
Sicard d'Ambres de Lautrec 1371–1383
Gui de Malsec 1383,  promoted to Poitiers
Simon de Cramaud 1383–1385, promoted bishop of Poitiers (1385)
Barthelemy de Montcalve 1384–1402
Bertrand II de Maumont 1408–1422, later bishop of Tulle (1422)
Hugues II de Combarel 1422–1424, promoted bishop of Poitiers (1424)
Guilhaume VII de Montjoie 1424–1451
Louis de Harcourt 13 October 1451 – 10 December 1451, promoted archbishop of Narbonne(1451)
Pierre III Bureau 1451–1456 or 1457
Jean I Bureau 1457–1490
Pierre IV Javailhac 1490–1503

From 1500

Antoine Dubois 1504–1537
Jean II de Lettes 1537–1543, resigned (1543)
Jean III de Narbonne 1543–1545
François Gouffier 1546–1547 or 12 February–5 December 1547
Lorenzo Strozzi 1547–1561, later bishop of Albi (1561)
Julien de Medicis 1561–1571 or 1574, later archbishop of Aix (1574)
André Etienne 1572
Thomas I de Bonsi 1573–1596, resigned 1596, died 1603
Jean de Bonsi 1596–1611, cardinal in 1611, died 1621
Dominique de Bonzi (Bonsi) 1615–1621
Thomas II de Bonsi 1622 or 1621–1628
Clément de Bonsi 1628–1659
Pierre de Bonzi 1659–1669, later bishop of Toulouse (1669)
Armand Jean de Rotondy de Biscaras 1671–1702
Louis-Charles des Alris de Rousset 1702–1744
Léon-Louis-Ange de Ghistelle de Saint-Floris 1744–1745
Joseph-Bruno de Bausset de Roquefort 1745–1771
Aymar Claude de Nicolaï 1771–1790, last bishop of Béziers. The diocese was suppressed in 1790.
Dominique Pouderous, (constitutional bishop of l'Hérault, installed at Béziers) 1791–1799 (died at Béziers 10 April 1799)
Alexandre Victor Rouanet, (constitutional bishop of l'Hérault, installed at Béziers)  1799–1801 (dismissed)

From 1802, the constitutional bishops of l'Hérault resided at Montpellier.

Jean-Paul-Gaston de Pins 1817–1822

See also
 Catholic Church in France
 List of Catholic dioceses in France

References

Bibliography

Reference works
  (Use with caution; obsolete)
  (in Latin) 
 (in Latin)

Studies
Bellaud Dessalles, Mathilde (1901), Les évèques italiens de l'ancien diocèse de Béziers, 1547-1669. Paris: A. Picard.

 second edition (in French)

Apostolic sees
Former Roman Catholic dioceses in France